GEM TV  is an Iranian group of entertainment satellite channels. Its headquarters is located in Istanbul, Turkey. This group also launched various channels in Arabic, Kurdish and Persian to expand its viewers.

History
GEM Television commenced work in 2006, owned and managed by GEM Group ("General Entertainment and Media Group"). GEM Group was established in 2001.

Current programs
GEM's current programming consists of movies, documentaries and acquired programs and shows like America's Got Talent and The X Factor. GEM also airs dubbed Turkish TV series such as Magnificent Century, Kuzey Güney, Fatmagül'ün Suçu Ne? and Merhamet. All of the programs are either dubbed or subtitled in Persian.

Assassination of Saeed Karimian
On 29 April 2017, Director of the GEM Group, Saeed Karimian, was assassinated in Istanbul. Tasnim News Agency, which is close to Iran Revolutionary Guards, had accused him of formerly being a member of the People's Mujahedin of Iran. Jam News, another news agency close to Iran's government, referred to GEM as "The most destructive anti-culture media" when reporting the incident. Some suggest that he was killed by Islamic Revolutionary Guard Corps, although it is not credible.

References

Television stations in Dubai
Persian-language television stations
Television channels and stations established in 2006